The Mozart family were the ancestors, relatives, and descendants of Wolfgang Amadeus Mozart. The earliest documents mentioning the name "Mozart", then spelled "Motzhart" or "Motzhardt", are from the Bavarian part of Swabia (today the Regierungsbezirk of Bavarian Swabia).

Mozart family

 Heinrich Motzhardt (after 1320–1400)
 Andris Motzhardt (?–1485)
 Hans Motzhardt
 David Motzhardt (?–1625/6), farmer in Pfersee, today a suburb of Augsburg
  (1620–1685), bricklayer and master builder in Augsburg; built the tower of the church in Dillingen an der Donau; married Maria Negele (1622–1697)
 Daniel Mozart (1645–1683)
  (1647–1719), bricklayer and master builder, guild master, built the provost's church St Georg in Augsburg, collaborated at the Fugger residence
 Franz Mozart (1649–1694), master builder
 Johann Georg Mozart (4 May 1679 – 19 February 1736), bookbinder in Augsburg, married (i) Anna Maria Banegger, childless; (ii) Anna Maria Sulzer (1696–1766)
 Leopold Mozart (1719–1787), composer, married Anna Maria Pertl (1720–1778)
 Johann Leopold Joachim Mozart (1748–1749)
 Maria Anna Cordula Mozart (1749–1749)
 Maria Anna Nepomucena Walpurgis Mozart (1750–1750)
 Maria Anna Mozart (Nicknamed "Nannerl"), (1751–1829) married Johann Baptist Franz von Berchtold zu Sonnenburg (1736–1801)
 Leopold Alois Pantaleon von Berchtold zu Sonnenburg (1785–1840), married Josephine Fuggs (1795-?)
 Henriette von Berchtold zu Sonnenburg (1817–1890), married Franz Forschter (1806–1871)
 Gustav Forschter (1841–1875)
 Bertha Forschter (1842–1919)
 Cäsar August Ernst von Bechtold zu Sonnenburg (1822–1822)
 Jeanette von Berchtold zu Sonnenburg (1789–1805)
 Maria Babette von Berchtold zu Sonnenburg (1790–1791)
 Johann Karl Amadeus Mozart (1752–1753)
 Maria Crescentia Francisca de Paula Mozart (1754–1754)
 Wolfgang Amadeus Mozart (1756–1791), composer, married Constanze Weber (1762–1842)
 Raimund Leopold Mozart (1783–1783)
 Karl Thomas Mozart (1784–1858), official in the service of the Viceroy of Naples in Milan; unmarried and childless
 Johann Thomas Leopold Mozart (1786–1786)
 Theresia Constantia Adelhaid Friederica Marianna Mozart (1787–1788)
 Anna Maria Mozart (1789–1789)
 Franz Xaver Wolfgang Mozart (1791–1844), composer and teacher; unmarried and childless
 Johann Christian Mozart (1721–1722)
 Johann Christian Mozart (1722–1755)
 Joseph Ignaz Mozart (1725–1796)
 Franz Alois Mozart (1727–1791), bookbinder in Augsburg, married Maria Victoria Eschenbach
 Maria Anna Thekla Mozart ("Bäsle") (1758–1841)
 Maria Josepha Berbier (1784–1842), married Franz Joseph Streitel
 Carl Joseph Streitel (c. 1803), died in infancy
 Maria Eleonora Mozart (1729–1806)
 Marie Dorothea Mozart (1731–1751)
 Theresia Franziska Mozart (1734–1800)
 Lorenz Anton Mozart (1735–1736)
 David Mozart (1653–1710), a Conventual Franciscan
 Johann Michael Mozart (1655–1718), sculptor
 Four daughters

Weber family 
The Weber family became connected with the Mozart family through the marriage of Wolfgang Amadeus to Constanze. The family were from Zell im Wiesental, Germany and included:

 Fridolin Weber (1691–1754), married Maria Eva Schlar
 Franz Fridolin Weber (1733–1779), married Cäcilia Cordula Stamm (1727–1793)
 Josepha Weber (1758–1819), soprano, married (i) Franz de Paula Hofer (1755–96) (ii) Sebastian Mayer (1773–1835)
 Aloysia Weber (c. 1760–1839), soprano, married Joseph Lange (1751–1831)
 Constanze Weber (1762–1842), married (i) Wolfgang Amadeus Mozart (1756–1791) (ii) Georg Nikolaus von Nissen (1761–1826)
 six children by Wolfgang Amadeus Mozart as above
 Sophie Weber (1763–1846), singer, married Jakob Haibel (1762–1826)
 Franz Anton Weber (1734–1812)
Carl Maria von Weber (1786–1826), composer

Gallery
Leopold Mozart, his wife and children

Wolfgang Mozart's wife and children

References

Further reading

  (1970/71). Die Augsburger Künstlerfamilie Mozart. Augsburg: Verlag Die Brigg.

External links

 
German families
Austrian families